The Zou people (also spelled Yo or Yaw or Jo or Jou ) are an indigenous community living along the frontier of India and Burma, they are a sub-group of the Zo people (Mizo-Kuki-Chin). In India, they live with and are similar in language and habits to the Paite and the Simte peoples. In Burma, the Zou are counted among the Chin people.They are a hill people , "Zou" may plainly means "Hills" denoting the Zous are "people of the hills" or "of the hills", and  "Zou" has also a different meaning in Zou language that is "complete" or another word for it is "finish". But, the Zou people believed that they incepted the name 'Zou' from their forefather 'Zou' or 'Zo', believed to be the progenitor of the broad Chin-Kuki-Mizo people. 

In India, the Zou are officially recognized as one of the thirty-three indigenous peoples within the state of Manipur, and are one of the Scheduled tribes. According to the 2001 Census, the Zou/Jou population in Manipur is around 20,000, less than 3% of the population. The community is concentrated in Churachandpur and Chandel districts of Manipur in North-East India.

Historical background

The early history of the Zou people is lost in myths and legends; they claim an origin somewhere in the north, and some claim that they are originally the same as the Paite and were only separated at the end of the British Raj. Linguistic and racial evidence suggest the Indo-Chinese origin of the people. Linguists classified the Zou language as Tibeto-Burman, with only small differences between Zote and Paite.

The American Baptist missionary, J.H. Cope, made an attempt to trace the pre-colonial history of the Chin Hills in a church journal, Tedim Thu Kizakna Lai. The journal (edited by Cope) provides a glimpse of the Zomis in Chin Hills before the arrival of British imperialism. Under the Manlun chiefs,

Zou language 

Zou/Jou is similar to Paite. It is classified as a northern Tibeto-Burman tribe. According to Ethnologue, there are 20,600 speakers in India (based on the 2001 Indian census) and around 31,000 speakers in Burma (no source given). The Zou/Zo language is one of the prescribed major Indian languages in the high schools.

Zous in Manipur

Crisis of pagan Sakhua religion
The Zou people resisted the British Raj and its colonial culture, including Christian conversion. The Maharajah of Manipur too did not permit Christian missionaries to work in the Imphal valley. However, a missionary called Watkin Roberts arrived at Senvawn village in the southern hills of Manipur in 1910. The Zou community did not come directly in contact with any Western missionary. While their neighbouring communities converted to Christianity, the Zous clung on to their traditional religion called Sakhua. (In the Chin hills of Burma, the Sakhua was also called Lawki religion). This indigenous form of worship is broadly and not so accurately labelled as "animism" in the ethnographic literature. The old Sakhua used to provide a satisfying explanation of the pre-colonial world; but the Zou colonial encounter exposed cracks in the old system. The experience of many young Zomis as a labour corps in World War I made them more open to Western education. The NEIG Mission Compound at Old Churachand became the centre of literate culture in southern Manipur since 1930. By the time of India's independence, many neo-literates among the Zous were convinced about the power of western education and medicine, perceiving these things as synonymous with Christianity itself.

Local church movement under the Jou Christian Association (JCA)

20th-century developments
The pagan Sakhua religion was under direct assault in Southern Manipur with the establishment of NEIG Mission at Old Churachand (Mission Compound) in 1930. The Vaiphei, Hmar, Paite and Thadou tribes were among the earliest advocates of Christian conversion. Along with the Simte, the Zou tribe was slow in responding to new ideas ushered in by the Christian mission. Perhaps due to their anti-colonial legacy, the Zous became the last bastion of pagan "Sakhua" in the area. Though cultural rootedness has its own merits, it was a setback for modernization. By the 1950s, there were a handful of Christian converts among the Zous too. But the Zou converts were disorganised and scattered. The new Zou Christian converts joined different dialectal groups, especially the Paite and Thado Christian groups. Among the intelligent sections of the Zou, there was a strong desire to stem the tide of this social crisis. Their solution was to embrace the local Church Movement by preserving the unity of the Zou community ironically through mass conversion.

Social impact of Christian conversion
Zous today preserve the best part of their traditional culture through their indigenous local church. Their customary laws related to marriage practices have been institutionalized by the church. Their tribal musical instrument (khuang made of wood and animal skin) is an integral part of church music. The Bible translations and hymnals preserved the best part of their traditional vocabulary harnessed to a different purpose. According to K.S. Singh, "The introduction of a new religion [Christianity] has not made any impact on their folk songs, the institution of indongta, and customs related to marriage, bride price and the dissolution of marriage. However, ancestor worship is being abandoned."

Recent scholarship, however, pointed out that Bible translations among the tribes of North-East India have become a victim of dialectal chauvinism Multiplying Bible translations in closely related but slightly different dialects have canonized and hardened ethnic divisions within the tribal groups of Manipur. For instance, the Zou language itself constitutes dialectal variants like Haidawi, Khuangnung, Thangkhal, Khodai and Tungkua. All these dialects contribute to Zou language in a process of give and take. Nevertheless, Haidawi is usually promoted as the standard literary language in the vernacular Bible and hymnals. Meanwhile, Khuangnung is popular among urban Zou speakers and Thangkhal heavily influences traditional Zou folk songs. Tungkua and Khodai still remain confined to remote villages. The inclusion of Zou as a Major Indian Language (till Standard XII) by the government of Manipur also contributed to the evolution of Zou as a standard literary language.

The Zous in Burma constitute a distinct Zou dialect influenced primarily by Tedim Chin. Though the Zous in India and Burma had been using a common Bible for decades, the Zous in Burma recently came up with their own Bible translation. At present, it is difficult to assess the social impact of such translation projects.

Patriarchy and tribal Christianity
In early 1925, Pu Hang Za Kham of Lungtak Village, Tonzang Township, Chin State, Burma (Myanmar) was converted to Christianity by Evangelist Vial Nang, and became the first Christian convert among Zo people. Access to modern education since the 1950s and 60s empowered some Zou women in the "secular" sphere and the job market. But ironically women are still discriminated in the "sacred" sphere of the church on gender basis. The Zou society, despite Christian conversion, still staunchly maintains its old patriarchal structure. The first generation of educated Zomi women, like Khan Niang and Geneve Vung Za Mawi, championed the cause of female education as late as the 1970s. A handful of Zou women (such as Dim Kho Chin, Ning Hoih Kim, and Ngai Vung) graduated in theology in the 1980s. There is limited space for women theologians within the formal church structure which is jealously guarded as a privileged male enclave. The church hierarchy still excludes women from any position of authority and "ordained" offices like that of minister or elder. Despite the advances made by women in the secular world, a recent study suggests that the status of women has been degraded (not upgraded) within the patriarchal world of the tribal church (cf. Downs 1996: 80–81).

However, women are encouraged in fundraising projects where they have made excellent contributions through strategies like antang pham (handful of rice collection), thabituh (annual labour targets), and veipung (profitable micro-investment). Antang pham remains the main source of fund raising by ladies. The idea was originally imported from Mizoram where women like Chhingtei of Durtlang and Siniboni (a Khasi lady) were instrumental in introducing the practice, sometime in 1913. The money collected by ladies is seldom invested in projects that benefit women as a specific group. Given the inequality of opportunities for men and women, this way of resource allocation is questionable. Recent statistics by the census of India (2001) show a significant gender gap between male and female literacy with 53.0% for female Zou and 70.2% for male Zou. Likewise, the sex ratio of the Zous in Manipur at 944 is lower than the state average of 978 (according to 2001 census). This compares poorly, for instance, with the sex ratio for Simte at 1030 and for Vaiphei at 1001 during the same period.

Political consciousness
Pu T. Gougin was the best known political leader who hailed form the Zou community. But this political entrepreneur soon transcended the narrow interests of his own 'tribe' to launch a pan-Zo or pan-Zomi solidarity movement to mobilise his co-ethnic members in Manipur, Mizoram and Myanmar. A recent piece published from Mumbai by the Economic and Political Weekly (EPW) made the following observation about Pu T. Gougin:

"At a time when tribal leaders were vying for state recognition of their dialectal communities as “Scheduled Tribes,” Gougin began to conceive the idea of Zomi, i.e., “Zo people” in 1955 while serving as a clerk of the Tribal Development Office, Imphal. This prompted him to resign from his clerical job in 1958, and then pursued BA (honours) at St. Edmund's College, Shillong. As a final year student, he founded the United Zomi Organisation (UZO) at Singtom village (Manipur) in 1961 to unite “all ethnic Zomi groups” (Gougin 1988: 3). When UZO was reduced to mere vote bank politics to the complete neglect of wider Zo solidarity, T. Gougin launched on 28 January 1972 a new organisation, Zomi National Congress (ZNC) at Daizang village (Manipur). He owned a printing press which helped him to propagate his nationalist vision through pamphlets, booklets and ephemeral literature. The Discovery of Zoland (1980) is perhaps Gougin's most enduring political writing" (p. 61).

References

External links
 MELC INDIA - Manipur Evangelical Lutheran Church, India (formerly known as Zomi Christian Church)
 ZOiNN.in - The Relic Center: To protect, promote and preserve the rich cultural heritage of the Zo/Zou

Ethnic groups in Manipur
Indigenous peoples of South Asia
Ethnic groups in Myanmar
Headhunting
Kuki tribes
Scheduled Tribes of Manipur
Hill tribes of Northeast India